María José Orellana Aragon (born April 8, 1981) is a female beach volleyball player from Guatemala, who played in the 2003 and 2007 Pan American Games playing with Sylvana Gómez and Anna Ramírez, finishing 5th and 9th.

Representing her native country during the 2006 Central American and Caribbean Games playing with Anna Ramírez, they finished in the 7th. position.

She has participated in many tournaments at the NORCECA Beach Volleyball Circuit.

She won the National Championship 2009, playing with Anna Ramírez.

She played Indoor Volleyball with her National Team at the 2006 World Championship qualifier. She acted as team captain, and finished 4th, not qualifying to the main event.

References

 
 
 World Championship Qualifier 2006 Guatemala Team

1981 births
Living people
Guatemalan beach volleyball players
Women's beach volleyball players
Pan American Games competitors for Guatemala
Beach volleyball players at the 2007 Pan American Games
Beach volleyball players at the 2011 Pan American Games
Beach volleyball players at the 2015 Pan American Games
Beach volleyball players at the 2003 Pan American Games